is a Japanese born racing cyclist. He rode in the men's sprint event at the 2020 UCI Track Cycling World Championships.

References

1990 births
Living people
Japanese male cyclists
Japanese track cyclists
People from Anjō
Cyclists at the 2018 Asian Games
Asian Games silver medalists for Japan
Asian Games bronze medalists for Japan
Medalists at the 2018 Asian Games
Asian Games medalists in cycling
20th-century Japanese people
21st-century Japanese people